The name Gloria has been used for eighteen tropical cyclones worldwide: three in the Atlantic Ocean, two in the Australian region, one in the South-West Indian Ocean, and twelve in the Western Pacific Ocean. It has also been applied to one extratropical European windstorm.

In the Atlantic Ocean:
 Hurricane Gloria (1976) – remained out at sea.
 Hurricane Gloria (1979) – a minor hurricane that stayed out to sea.
 Hurricane Gloria (1985) – grazed North Carolina and struck Long Island and Connecticut, causing $900 million in damage and eight deaths.
The name Gloria was retired after the 1985 season, and was replaced by Grace in the 1991 Atlantic hurricane season.

In the Australian region:
 Cyclone Gloria (1975)
 Cyclone Doris-Gloria (1980)

In the South-West Indian Ocean:
 Cyclone Gloria (2000) (15S)

In the Western Pacific Ocean:
 Typhoon Gloria (1949) (T4905)
 Typhoon Gloria (1952) (T5226)
 Typhoon Gloria (1957) (T5715) – struck the Philippines and Hong Kong.
 Tropical Storm Gloria (1960) (35W) – Japan Meteorological Agency analyzed it as a tropical depression, not as a tropical storm.
 Typhoon Gloria (1963) (T6314, 29W, Oniang) – struck Taiwan and eastern China.
 Tropical Storm Gloria (1965) (40W) – Japan Meteorological Agency analyzed it as a tropical depression, not as a tropical storm.
 Typhoon Gloria (1968) (T6819, 24W, Osang)
 Tropical Storm Gloria (1971) (35W) – Japan Meteorological Agency analyzed it as a tropical depression, not as a tropical storm.
 Typhoon Gloria (1974) (T7428, 32W, Aning)
 Tropical Storm Gloria (1978) (T7816, 17W)
 Typhoon Gloria (1996) (T9608, 09W) – hit Taiwan and China.
 Typhoon Gloria (1999) (T9922, 30W, Trining)
 Typhoon Chataan (2002) (T0206, 08W, Gloria) – a deadly and destructive Category 4 super typhoon that hit Chuuk, Federated States of Micronesia.

In Europe:
 Storm Gloria (2020) – brought severe flooding to southern and eastern Spain, killing at least 13 people

Atlantic hurricane set index articles
Pacific typhoon set index articles
South-West Indian Ocean cyclone set index articles
Australian region cyclone set index articles